Simon Francis Stanway (born 22 April 1966) is an English cricketer. Stanway is a right-handed batsman who bowls right-arm medium pace. He was born in Aylesbury, Buckinghamshire.

Stanway made his debut for Buckinghamshire in the 1989 Minor Counties Championship against Wales Minor Counties. Stanway has played Minor counties cricket for Buckinghamshire from 1989 to 2015, which includes 132 Minor Counties Championship matches and 53 MCCA Knockout Trophy matches. In 1997, he made his List A debut against Essex in the NatWest Trophy. He played 11 further List A matches for Buckinghamshire, the last coming against Lancashire in the 2005 Cheltenham & Gloucester Trophy. In his 12 List A matches, he took 9 wickets at a bowling average of 37.11, with best figures of 2/30.

Since 2006, he has played for Tring Park in the Home Counties Premier League, playing a total of 219 matches .

References

External links

1966 births
Living people
Sportspeople from Aylesbury
People from Buckinghamshire
English cricketers
Buckinghamshire cricketers